Jerod Elton Tufte (born April 9, 1975) is an American lawyer and jurist who is a justice of the North Dakota Supreme Court. He previously served as State's Attorney for Kidder County, counsel for Governor Jack Dalrymple, and district judge.

Early life and education 
Tufte was born in Minot, North Dakota. He graduated from Case Western Reserve University in 1997 and the Arizona State University College of Law in 2002.

Career 
Prior to law school, Tufte was a computer engineer for Motorola. After graduating from law school, he was a law clerk to Judge Roger Leland Wollman of the United States Court of Appeals for the Eighth Circuit from 2002 to 2003. He worked private practice in Phoenix, Arizona and Steele, North Dakota. He served as Kidder County State's Attorney for from 2005 to 2011 and Sheridan County State's Attorney in 2011. He was a JAG Corps officer for the North Dakota Army National Guard from 2008 to 2016. He was legal counsel to Governor Jack Dalrymple from 2011 to 2014. 

In 2014, Governor Dalrymple appointed Tufte district judge of the Southeast Judicial District. He served as district judge chambered at the Barnes County Courthouse in Valley City from 2014–2016. He was elected to the Supreme Court in 2016 and took office January 1, 2017.

References

External links 
 North Dakota Supreme Court website

1975 births
Living people
People from Minot, North Dakota
21st-century American lawyers
21st-century American judges
Case Western Reserve University alumni
Federalist Society members
United States Army Judge Advocate General's Corps
North Dakota National Guard personnel
National Guard (United States) officers
North Dakota lawyers
Justices of the North Dakota Supreme Court
Sandra Day O'Connor College of Law alumni